Lathyrus nevadensis, the Sierra pea or purple peavine, is a perennial herb with erect to climbing stems, native to the forests and clearings of western North America from British Columbia to northern California and as far east as Idaho.

Description    
The Lathyrus nevadensis plant is a trailer or weak climber vine, supported by tendrils, growing to 1.0 m-3 feet tall. The leaves are pinnate, with 4 to 10 leaflets and a straight, unbranched tendrils at the apex of the petiole. Its flowers are hermaphroditic, pollinated by bees. The plant can also spread vegetatively from creeping rhizomes.

Varieties
The species Lathryus parkeri (H.St.John), named after Charles S. Parker, was merged into Lathyrus nevadensis as var. parkeri. (H.St.John) C.L.Hitchc.

References

External links
 U. of Washington Burke Museum: Lathyrus nevadensis

nevadensis
Flora of California
Flora of Nevada
Flora of the Northwestern United States
Flora of the Sierra Nevada (United States)
Vines
Flora without expected TNC conservation status